Ford Times was a monthly publication produced by Ford Motor Company. The first issue was published on April 15, 1908 until April 1917, ceasing publication with America's entry into World War I. After a more than 20-year break, Ford Times resumed publishing in 1943. This iteration of the magazine would last 50 years until January 1993. The magazines were similar to Reader's Digest and Yankee.  Ford Times magazines were 4x6 inches in size and later 5x7 inches in size. Each issue usually consisted of several stories about destinations for sports or vacations or of historic interest, by such writers as Edward Ware Smith, Corey Ford, Bernard De Voto, and Edward Weeks as well as promotional information about current Ford vehicles. Early issues were monochrome. Issues in the 1950s and 1960s featured many paintings. Arthur Lougee was the art director then of both the Ford company's New England Journeys,  Ford Times and Lincoln Mercury Times. He featured in these publications dozens of America's contemporary watercolor artists such as John Whorf, Henry McDaniel, Forrest Orr, Glenn MacNutt, Loring Coleman, Stuart Eldridge, Paul Sample, King Coffin, Maxwell Mays, Robert Paul Thorpe, Estelle Coniff, Glen Krause, JWS Cox, C Robert Perrin, Edward Turner, Ward Cruickshank II, Alphonse J Shelton, RJ Holden, Dorothy Manuel, Frederick James, William Barss, Campbell Tinning, Eunice Utterback, Andrew Winter.  Paintings by Charley Harper and Henry E McDaniel were often on the covers. Mount Pleasant-based folk artist Grace McArthur contributed an oil painting for the cover of the December 1972 edition.

Ford Times Cookbooks 
A few cookbooks with recipes from past issues of Ford Times were produced.

Ford Truck Times 
Ford also produced a series of Truck Times magazines, released quarterly. These were slightly larger, and contained stories that revolved around trucks, as well as information about camping and vacation destinations similar to the regular Ford Times magazines.

References

Ford Times archive at HathiTrust
Brand Journalism: A Cultural History of Consumers, Citizens, and Community in Ford Times, Rebecca Dean Swenson, 2012

Automobile magazines published in the United States
Monthly magazines published in the United States
Defunct magazines published in the United States
Ford Motor Company
Magazines established in 1908
Magazines disestablished in 1996
Magazines published in Michigan
1908 establishments in Michigan